

193001–193100 

|-bgcolor=#f2f2f2
| colspan=4 align=center | 
|}

193101–193200 

|-id=158
| 193158 Haechan ||  || Haechan Kim (born 1994), son of South-Korean astronomer Seung-Lee Kim who discovered this minor planet || 
|}

193201–193300 

|-bgcolor=#f2f2f2
| colspan=4 align=center | 
|}

193301–193400 

|-bgcolor=#f2f2f2
| colspan=4 align=center | 
|}

193401–193500 

|-bgcolor=#f2f2f2
| colspan=4 align=center | 
|}

193501–193600 

|-bgcolor=#f2f2f2
| colspan=4 align=center | 
|}

193601–193700 

|-bgcolor=#f2f2f2
| colspan=4 align=center | 
|}

193701–193800 

|-id=736
| 193736 Henrythroop ||  || Henry Throop (born 1972), an American astronomer at the Planetary Science Institute who worked as a Science Team Collaborator and as a member of the Spacecraft Hazard Team for the New Horizons mission to Pluto. || 
|}

193801–193900 

|-bgcolor=#f2f2f2
| colspan=4 align=center | 
|}

193901–194000 

|-bgcolor=#f2f2f2
| colspan=4 align=center | 
|}

References 

193001-194000